Enrico Boselli (born 7 January 1957) is an Italian politician. He has been Vice President of Alliance for Italy, and is the former leader of the Italian Democratic Socialists and the modern-day Socialist Party, and former President of Emilia-Romagna.

Biography
A former member of the historical Italian Socialist Party (PSI), Boselli was first elected as MP in 1994. After the dissolution of the PSI in 1994, he has been leader of the Italian Socialists and the Italian Democratic Socialists.

He also served as Member of the European Parliament from 1999 to 2004 as member of the Group of the Party of European Socialists.

From September 1999 to 2001, Boselli served as rapporteur for the second reading of the InfoSoc directive, having been named by the Committee on Legal Affairs and the Internal Market.

He was one of the main minds behind his party's decision to join forces with the Italian Radicals of Emma Bonino to found the Rose in the Fist, on the occasion of the 2006 general election.

In 2007 he founded the new Socialist Party, with whom he participated in the 2008 general election, but obtained only 0.9% of the vote.

In December 2010, Boselli joined the centrist party Alliance for Italy, and became vice-president not long after.

References

1957 births
Living people
Politicians from Bologna
Presidents of Emilia-Romagna
MEPs for Italy 1999–2004
Italian Socialist Party politicians
Italian Democratic Socialists MEPs
Alliance for Italy politicians
Italian Socialists politicians